Stone Crossing railway station is located on the North Kent line, north-east of the village of Stone and east of Dartford. It was originally named Stone Crossing Halt. Trains are operated by Southeastern and Thameslink.

Train services from the station run eastbound to Gravesend and early morning and late evening onward to Gillingham. Westbound trains run to London Charing Cross via one of the three lines into Central London, the Dartford Loop Line via Sidcup, the Bexleyheath Line or the North Kent Line via Woolwich Arsenal.

Before rail privatisation, a ticket office was provided here, on the 'up' side, in the signal cabin adjacent to the level crossing gates at the eastern end of the station. This became unstaffed thereafter. A PERTIS passenger-operated ticket machine was in due course installed and issued 'Permits to Travel' - exchanged on-train or at staffed stations for travel tickets.  In October 2016 the PERTIS machine was removed and replaced with a new ticket machine.  The ticket machine is of the newer secure design and only accepts Card Payments.  A ticket office service is now provided for 3½ hours in the morning on weekdays.

Layout
Planning applications were lodged by Network Rail in the autumn of 2016 for a footbridge to be built (replacing the level crossing) at a reported cost of over £2 million.
The level crossing permanently closed on 25 February 2018 and the following day an adjacent footbridge, with ramped access, was opened.

Services

The typical off-peak service in trains per hour is:
 2 tph to London Charing Cross via 
 2 tph to  via  and 
 2 tph to 
 2 tph to  via 

References

External links

Railway stations in Kent
DfT Category E stations
Transport in the Borough of Dartford
Former South Eastern Railway (UK) stations
Railway stations in Great Britain opened in 1908
Railway stations served by Southeastern
1908 establishments in England
Railway stations served by Govia Thameslink Railway